Johl Younger (born 3 May 1969) is a former Australian professional snooker player.

References 

Australian snooker players
Living people
1969 births
Place of birth missing (living people)